is a Japanese swimmer. At the 2012 Summer Olympics, she competed for the national team in the Women's 4 × 100 metre freestyle relay, finishing in 7th place in the final. She also competed in the women's 50m freestyle, finishing with a time of 25.73 seconds in 35th place in the heats, and the 4 x 200 m freestyle relay.  At the 2016 Summer Olympics, she competed in the 50 m freestyle, finishing in 43rd, and was part of the Japanese women's 4 x 100 m freestyle team.

References

Living people
Olympic swimmers of Japan
Swimmers at the 2012 Summer Olympics
Swimmers at the 2016 Summer Olympics
Japanese female freestyle swimmers
Asian Games medalists in swimming
Swimmers at the 2010 Asian Games
Swimmers at the 2014 Asian Games
Universiade medalists in swimming
1990 births
Asian Games silver medalists for Japan
Asian Games bronze medalists for Japan
Medalists at the 2010 Asian Games
Medalists at the 2014 Asian Games
Universiade silver medalists for Japan
Medalists at the 2009 Summer Universiade
Medalists at the 2011 Summer Universiade
21st-century Japanese women